LCC may refer to:

Organizations

Education
 La Consolacion College (disambiguation), several colleges
 La Costa Canyon High School
 Lakeland Community College
 Lakewood Cultural Center
 Lane Community College
 Lansing Community College
 Laredo Community College
 LCC International University
 Leeds City College
 Leeward Community College
 Lethbridge Community College
 Lews Castle College
 Lexington Community College
 Life Chiropractic College
 Lima Central Catholic High School
 Lincoln Christian College and Seminary
 Lithuania Christian College
 Liverpool Community College
 London College of Communication
 Lower Canada College
 Lower Columbia College

Companies
 Language Computer Corporation
 Littleton Coin Company
 US Airways Group (former New York Stock Exchange ticker symbol)
 Leeds Children's Charity, England
Light Car Company

Politics
 Local Coordination Committees of Syria
 League of Communists of Croatia
 Latvian Central Council

Local government
 Lancashire County Council
 Lancaster City Council
 Leeds City Council, England
 Leicester City Council
 Leicestershire County Council
 Lincolnshire County Council
 Liverpool City Council
 London County Council (1889–1965)

Other organisations
 Law Commission of Canada
 Leinster Cricket Club
 Liberal Catholic Church
 Lisburn Cricket Club
 Loyalist Communities Council
 Lutheran Church–Canada

Transport
 Amphibious Command Ship (hull classification)
 Launch commit criteria
 Launch Control Center, at Kennedy Space Center
 Lochluichart railway station (National Rail station code), Scotland
 London congestion charge
 London Cycling Campaign
 Low-cost carrier, an airline that emphasizes low fares

Science and technology
 LCC (compiler), Local C Compiler or Little C Compiler
 Lambert conformal conic projection, map projection
 Landscape conservation cooperatives, a network of regional conservation bodies covering the entire United States and adjacent areas
Large-cell carcinoma, a group of malignant neoplasms
 Launch control center (ICBM)
 Leadless chip carrier, a type of connection for integrated circuit chips.
 Line-commutated converters, for high-voltage direct current

Other uses
 Life-cycle cost
 Library of Congress Classification
 Lithuanian Civil Code, Civil Code of Lithuania
 Louisiana Civil Code, Civil Code of Louisiana
 Low context culture, a culture's tendency not to cater towards in-groups
 Lydian Chromatic Concept of Tonal Organization, a 1953 jazz music theory book
 "LCC", a song by electronic group Autechre, from the album Untilted